Walter George Don (25 September 1891 – 1 June 1957) was an Australian rules footballer who played with Carlton and University.

He later served in World War I.

Sources

External links

1891 births
Australian rules footballers from Victoria (Australia)
University Football Club players
Carlton Football Club players
1957 deaths
Australian military personnel of World War I
Military personnel from Victoria (Australia)
People from Shepparton